Martin O'Connell may refer to:
Martin O'Connell (Gaelic footballer) (born 1963), Irish Gaelic footballer
Martin O'Connell (politician) (1916–2003), Canadian politician
Martin O'Connell (racing driver)
Joe O'Connell (Irish republican) (Martin Joseph O'Connell, born 1951)